Redwood Falls is a city in Redwood County, located along the Redwood River near its confluence with the Minnesota River, in the U.S. state of Minnesota. The population was 5,102 at the 2020 census. It is the county seat.

History
As the immigrant and the Euro-American population of the North American east coast region grew, population pressures affected people far inland. People moved west to find new homes as more and more land was used by farmers. The Minnesota area is the ancestral homeland of the several Dakota peoples, who consisted of the loosely confederated Oceti sakowin (Seven Council Fires). By 1700, Ojibwe, who spoke an Anishinaabe language, had also come to what is now Minnesota from the further east around the Great Lakes. At times they came into conflict with the Dakota over land and resources and began to push them to the west.

19th century
By the mid-19th century, the traditional Dakota yearly cycle of farming, hunting, fishing, and gathering wild rice had been disrupted by cultural changes. Permanent farms were established by European-American settlers, changing habitat. In addition, they removed forests in eastern Minnesota for timber and to develop farmland. Wild game such as bison, elk, whitetail deer, and bear had been hunted so intensively that populations were much reduced compared to the centuries before Euro-American settlement. Dakota people relied on the sale of valuable furs to American traders to earn cash needed to buy necessities.

To encourage the Dakota to bring in more furs, traders offered merchandise on credit. It is not clear that the Dakota well understood the concept of credit, but they grew to depend on trade goods for metal tools and other items.

Pressure from traders who wanted to be paid and concern from government officials about the ability of the Dakota to earn the money they needed, led to the 1851 Treaty of Traverse des Sioux. The federal government wanted to extinguish Native American land title to tracts of land and offered the people annuities of money and goods in exchange. The Dakota agreed to live on a twenty-mile-wide reservation centered on a 75-mile stretch of the upper Minnesota River. Annuity payments for the Dakota were late in the summer of 1862, an example of a pattern of poor delivery of payments and supplies to them.

The site of the future town of Redwood Falls was within the Dakota reservation area along the lower Minnesota River. The war of 1862 was a small segment in Sioux history of conflict with European Americans. Corruption and malfeasance by the Bureau of Indian Affairs resulted in delays of payments of annuities and supplies of promised supplies, causing great hardships for the Dakota. In addition, they struggled with the effects of the relocation and inability to adjust to settled subsistence farming.

An August 4, 1862 confrontation between soldiers and Dakota men led the Indian Agency near Granite Falls to distribute provisions to the tribe on credit to avoid violence. At the Lower Agency at Redwood, however, things were handled differently. At an August 15, 1862 meeting attended by Dakota representatives, Indian Agent Thomas Galbraith, and representatives of the traders, the traders resisted pleas to distributing provisions held in agency warehouses to starving Dakota until the annuity payments arrived. In 1862, U.S. officials in Minnesota were distracted by the U.S. Civil War, payments did not arrive, and the suffering of the Dakota was severe. Some young Dakota took action to claim what they were owed, killing several people in the process. This began the Dakota War of 1862.

As a result of the war, the U.S. government hanged 38 participants and attempted to expel the Dakota people from Minnesota altogether. But it ended up maintaining the Lower Sioux Indian Reservation in Redwood County. Over time, the Dakota lost control of much of the land first set aside in 1851.

In 1864, Sam McPhail, a colonel who had commanded US troops in the war and was a land speculator, claimed the land where Redwood Falls was developed. He hired men to use lumber from the Dakota reservation to build a fortified house and surrounded it with a sod stockade eight feet tall. McPhail published the Redwood Falls Patriot from 1866 to 1869. He was a probate judge and first Redwood County attorney. In 1872, he donated land for the county courthouse as Redwood Falls was designated as the county seat.

Among settlers who joined McPhail in 1864 was John St. George Honner. Honner claimed land north of Redwood Falls. The house he built in 1869 still stands in North Redwood and is listed on the National Register of Historic Places. Honner was appointed as the first postmaster and also served as a county official. Active in electoral politics, he served as a representative and later as a senator in the state legislature between 1866 and 1874. Honner operated a granite quarry near North Redwood and supplied the stone for the county courthouse.

20th century to present
After World War II, Redwood Falls was home to the Minnesota Inventors Congress. Started in 1958 to encourage innovation and entrepreneurship and attract industry to town, MIC held a juried exhibition each year. It also sponsored a contest for student inventors and a parade for the city. After a 58-year run, the MIC was ended in 2014 due to a lack of funding.

The city of Redwood Falls took over Alexander Ramsey Park in 1958 from the state of Minnesota. Ramsey had been one of the least used and least developed state parks. It has been improved as the largest municipal park in Minnesota.

The cities of North Redwood and Redwood Falls merged in 1996; they are now known as the single entity, Redwood Falls. In 2010 Native Americans composed more than 6% of the population in the city. They continue to live in many areas of Minnesota.

Geography
The Redwood River flows through the city near its mouth at the Minnesota River.

Redwood Falls is located along U.S. Highway 71. Other main highways in the city include Minnesota State Highways 19 and 67.

Climate
Redwood Falls has a hot-summer humid continental climate (Köppen Dfa), with hot summers and freezing winters.

Demographics

2010 census
As of the census of 2010, there were 5,254 people, 2,265 households, and 1,341 families residing in the city. The racial makeup of the city was 87.8% White, 0.6% African American, 6.6% Native American, 0.7% Asian, 0.6% from other races, and 3.6% from two or more races. Hispanic or Latino of any race were 3.3% of the population.

There were 2,265 households, of which 28.9% had children under the age of 18 living with them, 42.8% were married couples living together, 12.1% had a female householder with no husband present, 4.3% had a male householder with no wife present, and 40.8% were non-families. 37.0% of all households were made up of individuals, and 17.9% had someone living alone who was 65 years of age or older. The average household size was 2.23 and the average family size was 2.89.

The median age in the city was 42.1 years. 24.3% of residents were under the age of 18; 7.3% were between the ages of 18 and 24; 21.4% were from 25 to 44; 26.4% were from 45 to 64; and 20.7% were 65 years of age or older. The gender makeup of the city was 47.7% male and 52.3% female.

2000 census
As of the census of 2000, there were 5,459 people, 2,266 households, and 1,389 families residing in the city. The racial makeup of the city was 93.28% White, 0.22% African American, 3.88% Native American, 0.48% Asian, 0.04% Pacific Islander, 0.77% from other races, and 1.34% from two or more races. Hispanic or Latino of any race were 1.92% of the population.

There were 2,266 households, out of which 30.1% had children under the age of 18 living with them, 49.2% were married couples living together, 9.2% had a female householder with no husband present, and 38.7% were non-families. 34.2% of all households were made up of individuals, and 16.5% had someone living alone who was 65 years of age or older. The average household size was 2.29 and the average family size was 2.94.

In the city, the population was spread out, with 25.0% under the age of 18, 6.9% from 18 to 24, 25.6% from 25 to 44, 23.1% from 45 to 64, and 19.3% who were 65 years of age or older. The median age was 40 years. For every 100 females, there were 92.2 males. For every 100 females age 18 and over, there were 87.1 males.

The median income for a household in the city was $38,812, and the median income for a family was $52,589. Males had a median income of $31,776 versus $24,085 for females. The per capita income for the city was $22,279.  About 5.3% of families and 7.5% of the population were below the poverty line, including 6.3% of those under age 18 and 10.8% of those age 65 or over.

Politics

Media

Television

See also
Lower Sioux Indian Reservation

References

External links

City Website
Redwood Area Chamber and Tourism – Community and Visitor Information

Cities in Minnesota
Cities in Redwood County, Minnesota
County seats in Minnesota